Dennis Yablonsky  was the CEO of the Allegheny Conference from 2008 to 2017, when he retired. He previously served as a member of Pennsylvania Governor Ed Rendell's cabinet as Secretary of Pennsylvania Department of Community and Economic Development. He was nominated for that position in 2003. He resigned in 2008.

He holds a degree from the University of Cincinnati. He was CEO of Carnegie Group Incorporated from 1987 through 1999. Prior to that, he served in various roles, including President and CEO, for Cincom Systems.

He was named to the PoliticsPA list of "Pennsylvania's Smartest Staffers and Operatives."

External links
Allegheny Conference bio

References

Living people
University of Cincinnati alumni
State cabinet secretaries of Pennsylvania
Year of birth missing (living people)